Pacific Airways Corporation operating as Pacificair is a charter airline based in Manila in the Philippines. It operates scheduled passenger flights, as well as air taxi services, and agricultural work. Its main base is Ninoy Aquino International Airport, Manila.

History
The airline was established in 1947. However, its franchise to operate air services was approved by Congress of the Philippines on February 23, 1995, through Republic Act No. 7909.

Incidents and accidents
On 2 April 1996, de Havilland Canada DHC-6 Twin Otter 200 RP-C1154 taxied across Manila International Airport runway 13 at the Taxiway F1 intersection. At the same moment Boeing 737 (EI-BZF) was taking off and collided with the Twin Otter. The 737 carried the Twin Otter for  before coming to a halt. The aircraft was taxiing to the Pacific Airways hangar after passenger disembarkation at the General Aviation ramp.

On 9 June 1999, Britten-Norman BN-2A-21 Islander RP-C471 crashed near Coron Airport and was written off. There was two crew fatality (pilot: Angelito V. Ruiz, SR. & Co-pilot J. Cristobal).

On 16 October 2004, Britten-Norman BN-2A-21 Islander RP-C1325, bound from Coron Airport to Puerto Princesa Airport with 700 kilos of live fish, flew into the side of Mount Tagpao. Weather was poor with heavy rains. There were two crew fatalities. The aircraft was written off.

Fleet
The Pacificair fleet includes the following aircraft (at March 2007):
4 Britten-Norman BN2A Islander

References

External links
Pacific Airways Online

Airlines of the Philippines
Companies based in Manila
Philippine companies established in 1947
Airlines established in 1947